The PitchWise Festival is an annual four-day feminist music, art and activism festival held in Sarajevo, Bosnia and Herzegovina. It was established in 2005 by the CURE Foundation and has steadily grown into an international attraction that now includes major touring acts, art collectives, outdoor industry partners, film screenings, exhibitions, political theatre productions, prominent speakers, and more. The 2017 edition hosted over 70 female artists, collectives, musicians and activists from 36 different countries.

References

External links
 Official website

Festivals established in 2005
September events
Tourist attractions in Sarajevo
Annual events in Bosnia and Herzegovina
Art festivals
Festivals in Sarajevo
Feminism in Bosnia and Herzegovina